Better Environmentally Sound Transportation (BEST) is a Vancouver-based Canadian charity focused on promoting mobility justice through programs around walking, cycling, public transit, and other forms of sustainable transportation in British Columbia. Founded in 1991, this non-profit organization has built innovative programs which seek to remove barriers to active, low-carbon, and green travel, such as The Bicycle Valet, Seniors on the Move, and Living Streets. BEST maintains itself through social enterprises, grants, sponsorships, and donations.

History

BEST is a non profit organization, established in 1991. It seeks to make cycling a more accessible form of transportation, not just for the privileged few, but also for people with lower incomes and limited access to cars. Through time, it evolved to advocate and encourage all forms of sustainable transportation. The organization started Our Community Bikes, Vancouver’s first do-it-yourself bike store which includes a full-service mechanic and retail bike shop, a club for youth to learn bike skills, as well as Pedals for the People which provides refurbished bikes to people in need. 

In 1997 BEST launched the Go Green Choices Program, working with TransLink, the regional transportation authority, to promote sustainable transportation to workplaces. Two years later it spun Our Community Bikes into its own non-profit, PEDAL, which ran summer bike camps for kids, refurbishes old bikes, and trained and teaches people to fix their bikes. Also, that year, BEST started Street Reclaiming, Moving for Change, and Off-Ramp, an internationally awarded project promoting sustainable transportation in secondary schools.

BEST is well-known for its role in the development of the Central Valley Greenway, a 24-km long pedestrian and cyclist route running from Vancouver to New Westminster through Burnaby. This project kickstarted when Vancity Credit Union awarded BEST with a 1 million dollar grant to develop the project. BEST received a Gold Environmental Star from the City of Burnaby for this work.

BEST also created and ran an annual celebratory campaign aimed at promoting bicycling in British Columbia. The initiative called June is Bike Month resulted in unprecedented media coverage and awareness. After 10 years, the initiative resulted in the creation of an online page highlighting the great cycling activities going on in the region.

Over the years, BEST has focused on building viable social enterprises based on offering services to encourage and enable sustainable modes of transportation for the community. In 2016, BEST began offering Parkbus BC to transport people to BC Provincial Parks without the need for a car. Years later, a partnership with a global movement called Cycling Without Age aimed to improve the quality of life of the elderly population through outdoor activities and social interaction. 
With the arrival of the Covid-19 pandemic in March 2020, the non-profit had to paralyze most of the active projects to ensure the safety of the population. BEST currently has three main active projects: The Bicycle Valet, Living Streets, and Seniors On The Move.

Programs

The Bicycle Valet
Founded in 2006, The Bicycle Valet operates free, safe bicycle parking services at festivals, events, Vancouver Whitecaps and BC Lions games, and many other happenings around the Metro Vancouver area. The program promotes cycling as an environmentally friendly transportation option and as an alternative to driving. In the 16 years of the project, more than 280,000 bicycles have been parked with The Bicycle Valet throughout British Columbia. It is run by both staff and volunteers.
 
The Bicycle Valet has had seasonal locations at Granville Island since 2015, and recently expanded its seasonal valets in 2022 to run pilot valets in Richmond and Victoria. It also works with Garage 529 to further prevent bike theft in the Lower Mainland.

Living Streets
Living Streets promotes walking for myriad benefits: enriching and experiencing public spaces; creating community ties; as a feasible method of transportation, and as a catalyst for physical and mental health. Living Streets also works to identify opportunities for education and public engagement in the pedestrian realm.
Selected to be part of the 2021 Women4Climate mentoring program by the City of Vancouver, Living Streets has grown and positioned itself as one of the referents in walkability in the Metro Vancouver Region and beyond.

Living Streets oversee the following:

1) Knowledge strategy: research, communicate and engage. 

2) To read, learn, and provide updates from peers and best practices around walkability and what walking means to the program, both individually and collectively.

3) To share knowledge through communications channels, both online and in-person events.

4) To promote engagement at the municipal and provincial levels.

Living Streets has 4 established projects whose focus is walking, each operating with different lenses and audiences:

Walk30 involves health authorities, school districts, and transportation departments to record their walking minutes through a friendly community competition for municipalities and a city-wide walking promotion campaign. Walk30 has successfully run in Burnaby, New Westminster, and the City of North Vancouver.

Walktober recognizing that October is Latin American Heritage Month, Living Streets partnered with Latincouver to deliver a cultural awareness campaign promoting walking when days become shorter and colder while learning about different aspects of the Latin culture, music, and food in BC.

4 Seasons Walks organize walks for all ages and abilities to improve mental health, reduce depression, and fight social isolation. This program offers the benefits of fostering spaces for newcomers to meet other people, explore the spaces around their community, and learn how to use public transit and other alternatives to driving.

Flâneuse is a book club by and for women who love urban planning and transportation. This project is currently in its pilot phase, with a selected group of transportation and urban planning professionals. In 2023 the project will  work on building a network of women with professional transportation and urban planning backgrounds, or passionate about the topic, to talk and reflect on walking, planning, and transportation, via a selection of books where women and walkability play a significant role in the book. This is a safe space to amplify female-identified voices by reflecting on the role of women in public spaces.

Seniors on The Move (SOTM)
Seniors on the Move (SOTM) is a systems change project led by seniors in BC to improve and increase transportation options for older adults across the province. The program aims to better transportation options for seniors, through initiatives, collaboration, and leadership with different institutions.

SOTM encourages individuals, communities, and institutions to plan better for age-related changes in transportation, recognizing that we are experiencing an aging population, with 25% of people in BC being 65+ in less than 10 years.

Terminated Projects

Senior Transportation Access and Resources (STAR) 
STAR (Seniors Transportation Access and Resources) started in 2011. They collaborated with senior-focused organizations across B.C. to improve and develop transportation services for older adults. Its largest project includes establishing Seniors on the Move, a project focused on addressing the social isolation that many senior citizen experiences. Coming out of this project, the Seniors Transportation Hub and Hotline were created in collaboration with bc211.

Parkbus 
Parkbus expanded to British Columbia in 2016. Parkbus provided accessible transportation options to various National and Provincial Parks across Canada. In B.C., destinations included Golden Ears Provincial Park, Garibaldi Provincial Park, Joffre Lakes Provincial Park, and Cypress Provincial Park. One of their most popular programs, ActiveDays, led group hikes in nature and aspired to create outdoor communities.

The Commuter Challenge
The Commuter Challenge in BC was created in 1997 as part of Canadian Environment Week. The competition ran annually during the first week of June and encouraged people coming to and from work to walk, cycle, take transit, ride share, or work from home. Participants tracked their commutes and achievements online.

ParkPass
ParkPass was a booking platform that assisted park agencies in their visitor flow and operations. It allowed parks to distribute parking and visitor passes in advance, control the availability of spots in popular peak times and tourist areas, and provided alternatives for the public to discover alternative destinations. Users received real-time messages and important park information to made park visits safer and more enjoyable.

References 

Non-profit organizations based in Vancouver
Charities based in Canada
Sustainable transport
1991 establishments in Canada